The Athens Democracy Forum (ADF), in association with The New York Times, is an international conference organized by The Democracy and Culture Foundation. It is held annually in September or October and has taken place in Athens, Greece since 2013. The forum brings together international business leaders, academics, policy makers and experts to discuss and focus on new solutions to the most pressing issues facing democracy. The aim of the Athens Democracy Forum is "to serve as the North Star on which democracy and society can reorient themselves". It seeks to make democracy work. 

Key events include the Aristotle Address, the City of Athens Democracy Award, and the Ancient Agora Global Conversation.

History 
From 2013 - 2018, the Athens Democracy Forum was convened by The New York Times. Since 2019, the event has been organized by the non-profit organization, The Democracy & Culture Foundation.

Conferences

2022 Conference 
The 10th Athens Democracy Forum took place from September 28-30 at the Zappeion Megaron, Stoa of Attalos and the Academy of Athens. 250 international guests attended the event from over 30 countries. European Commission President Ursula von der Leyen delivered the Aristotle keynote address and among the many prominent speakers were the 8th United Nations Secretary General Ban Ki-moon, American Economist Jeffrey Sachs, Vice President for Values and Transparency, European Commission Vera Jourova, Writer and Academic Yascha Mounk and Founder and Chair, Mo Ibrahim Foundation Mo Ibrahim.

City of Athens Democracy Award 
Established in 2016 by the Mayor of Athens, the City of Athens Democracy Award is presented annually at the Athens Democracy Forum to individuals with international recognition, whose work and ethics defend democratic principles.

Recipients 
 2016 – Kenneth Roth, Executive Director of Human Rights Watch
 2017 – H.E. Felipe González Márquez, Former Prime Minister of Spain
 2018 – H.E. Joaquim Alberto Chissano, Former President of Mozambique
 2019 – Pawel Adamowicz, Former Mayor of the City of Gdańsk
 2020 – Fernando Henrique Cardoso, Former President of Brazil
 2021 – Wai Wai Nu, a Burmese activist
 2022 - People of Ukraine and President Volodymyr Zelenskyy

Advisory board 

 Serge Schmemann – Member of the Editorial Board, Athens Democracy Forum Chairman and Program Director, The New York Times
 Jane Bornemeier – Editor, Special Sections, The New York Times
 Jonathan Charles – Managing Director, Communications, European Bank for Reconstruction and Development
 Kim Conniff Taber – Editorial Director, Democracy and Culture Foundation
 Kishore Mahbubani – Former President, U.N. Security Council, and Professor in the Practice of Public Policy, National University of Singapore
 Corinne Momal-Vanian – Executive Director, Kofi Annan Foundation
 Khalil Osiris – Founder, Truth & Reconciliation Conversations
 Alexis Papahelas – Executive Editor, Kathimerini
 Alexandra Pascalidou – Journalist, Author, TV & Radio host, speaker, moderator
 Anita Patil – Editorial Director, The New York Times Licensing Group
 Lex Paulson – Director, School of Collective Intelligence, UM6P, Morocco
 Alexander Rhodes – Managing Associate, Mishcon de Reya
 Iain Walker – Executive Director, NewDemocracy Foundation
 Jayathma Wickramanayake – United Nations Secretary General's Envoy on Youth, United Nations

References

External links 
 Official Website
 Democracy & Culture Foundation

International conferences

Democracy
Annual events in Athens